Takashi Nonomura (born 20 March 1969) is a Japanese wrestler. He competed at the 1992 Summer Olympics and the 1996 Summer Olympics.

References

1969 births
Living people
Japanese male sport wrestlers
Olympic wrestlers of Japan
Wrestlers at the 1992 Summer Olympics
Wrestlers at the 1996 Summer Olympics
Sportspeople from Aichi Prefecture
Asian Games medalists in wrestling
Wrestlers at the 1994 Asian Games
Asian Games bronze medalists for Japan
Medalists at the 1994 Asian Games
20th-century Japanese people
21st-century Japanese people
Asian Wrestling Championships medalists